Schistura personata is a species of ray-finned fish, a stone loach, in the genus Schistura.It has only been recorded in the Nam San, a tributary of the Nam Ngum in the Mekong Basin of Laos where it can be found in moderately fast or fast flowing streams, among riffles, with a stone or gravel bed. Its population has been impacted by dams and by deforestation, agriculture and small scale gold mining and it is thought that it has declined.

References

P
Fish described in 2000